Haitham Mrabet (born 15 October 1980) is a Tunisian former footballer who played as a midfielder.

Career
Born in Sfax, Mrabet played club football for CS Sfaxien, Al-Merreikh and Étoile du Sahel.

Mrabet earned 5 international caps for Tunisia between 2005 and 2010, which included appearing in one FIFA World Cup qualifying match. He was a squad member at the 2010 Africa Cup of Nations.

References

1980 births
Living people
Tunisian footballers
Tunisia international footballers
CS Sfaxien players
Al-Merrikh SC players
Étoile Sportive du Sahel players
Association football midfielders
Tunisian expatriate footballers
Tunisian expatriate sportspeople in Sudan
Expatriate footballers in Sudan